Forest Of Eden is a 2013 compilation album featuring unreleased and demo versions of songs by American folk singer Jackson C. Frank. It was released as a 10-inch vinyl that was packaged with a CD version of the same content. The title track is previously unreleased while "I Want To Be Alone" and "Here Come The Blues" were demo recordings for his 1965 self-titled album. Also featured are two Elvis Presley covers Frank recorded in the mid-1950s.

Track listing
All songs written by Jackson C. Frank, except where noted
 "Forest Of Eden" – 3:08
 (Spoken Intro) "Heartbreak Hotel" (Mae Boren Axton, Thomas Durden) – 2:34
 "Santa, Bring My Baby Back to Me / Precious Lord" (Aaron Schroeder, Claude Demetrius) – 2:43
 "I Want To Be Alone" – 2:17
 "Here Come The Blues" – 4:20
 "You Never Wanted Me" – 4:25

References 

2013 compilation albums
Jackson C. Frank albums
Compilation albums published posthumously
Secret Records albums